Sierra de Enguera is a  long mountain range in the Canal de Navarrés and Valle de Cofrentes comarcas, Valencian Community, Spain. Its highest point is Altos de Salomón (1,056 m.) in the Caroig Massif. Other important peaks are Palmera (880 m.), Cova Negra (862 m.) and Marc (830 m.).

This mountain chain is named after the town of Énguera, located to the east of the range.

See also
Mountains of the Valencian Community

References

External links
La sierra de Enguera
ADENE (Associació en Defensa de la Natura d'Énguera)

Enguera
Alto Palancia
Alto Mijares
Plana Baixa